Präz (Romansh: Preaz) was a municipality in the district of Hinterrhein in the Swiss canton of Graubünden.  On 1 January 2010 the municipalities of Portein, Präz, Sarn and Tartar merged into the municipality of Cazis.

History
Präz is first mentioned in 1290-98 as Pare(t)z.

Geography

Of this area, 45.3% is used for agricultural purposes, while 47.9% is forested. Of the rest of the land, 2.8% is settled (buildings or roads) and the remainder (4%) is non-productive (rivers, glaciers or mountains).

The municipality is located in the Thusis sub-district, of the Hinterrhein district and is located on the Heinzenberg mountains.  It consists of the haufendorf (an irregular, unplanned and quite closely packed village, built around a central square) village of Präz and the hamlets of Dalin and Raschlinas as well as scattered farm houses.  The municipalities of Portein, Präz, Sarn, and Tartar merged on 1 January 2010 into Cazis.

Demographics

Präz has a population of 161, of which 5.0% are foreign nationals.  Over the last 10 years the population has decreased at a rate of -20.3%.

, the gender distribution of the population was 48.4% male and 51.6% female.  The age distribution, in Präz is; 29 people or 16.3% of the population are between 0 and 9 years old.  13 people or 7.3% are 10 to 14, and 9 people or 5.1% are 15 to 19.  Of the adult population, 17 people or 9.6% of the population are between 20 and 29 years old.  33 people or 18.5% are 30 to 39, 21 people or 11.8% are 40 to 49, and 22 people or 12.4% are 50 to 59.  The senior population distribution is 15 people or 8.4% of the population are between 60 and 69 years old, 12 people or 6.7% are 70 to 79, there are 5 people or 2.8% who are 80 to 89, and there are 2 people or 1.1% who are 90 to 99.

In the 2007 federal election the most popular party was the SVP which received 48% of the vote.  The next three most popular parties were the SPS (24.6%), the FDP (17.3%) and the CVP (9.7%).

The entire Swiss population is generally well educated.  In Präz about 70.5% of the population (between age 25-64) have completed either non-mandatory upper secondary education or additional higher education (either University or a Fachhochschule).

Präz has an unemployment rate of 0.82%.  , there were 45 people employed in the primary economic sector and about 18 businesses involved in this sector.  1 person is employed in the secondary sector and there is 1 business in this sector.  7 people are employed in the tertiary sector, with 5 businesses in this sector.

The historical population is given in the following table:

Languages
Most of the population speaks German (95.5%), with Romansh being second most common ( 2.8%) and Italian being third ( 0.6%).  The Romansh population speaks the Sutsilvan dialect.

References

External links
Official Web site

Cazis
Former municipalities of Graubünden
Populated places disestablished in 2010
2010 disestablishments in Switzerland